Shangolabad may refer to:
 Shangolabad, Bostanabad
 Shangolabad, Shabestar